Terry McGuire is a co-founder and general partner of Polaris Partners based in the Boston office. McGuire focuses on life sciences investments.

Career
Prior to starting Polaris, McGuire spent seven years as a partner at the venture capital firm Burr, Egan, Deleage & Co. investing in early-stage medical and information technology companies.  McGuire was also a partner at Beta Partners from 1988 to 1997.  His venture capital career began at Golder, Thoma & Cressey in Chicago.

Through the years, McGuire has invested in a multitude of companies spanning several industries.  These investments include Akamai, Aspect Medical Systems, Cubist Pharmaceuticals, GlycoFi, Transform Pharmaceuticals, and Remon Medical Technologies.  Akamai is an internet service that deals with Web interactions, and works to improve effective connections. Today, Akamai is a public company.  Another example is GlycoFi, which creates biotherapeutics through proteins.  GlycoFi was acquired by Merck in 2006.

McGuire has co-founded three companies: Inspire Pharmaceuticals, AIR (Advanced Inhalation Research, Inc.), and MicroCHIPS.  AIR has created a drug delivery method that allows drugs to be inhaled into the lungs.

Companies Terry has supported have touched more than 60 million patients and directly saved over 400,000 lives.  These companies have raised over $6 billion in equity and corporate capital.  As a group, they have achieved a combined peak enterprise value of over $40 billion.

Other affiliations 
McGuire is currently a member and formerly the 2009 - 2010 chairman of the National Venture Capital Association, the largest organization of venture capital firms in the United States.  During his tenure as NVCA Chairman, in October 2009, McGuire testified before Congress for Dodd-Frank Wall Street Reform and Consumer Protection Act.  In 2010, McGuire founded the Global Venture Capital Congress which is an annual gathering of venture capital and private equity leaders dedicated to actively supporting the world's venture capital and entrepreneurial economy through the sharing of common issues and ideas, the discussion of regional differences and opportunities for collaboration, and the communication of best practices on a global basis. McGuire is also the Chair of the board of overseers at the Thayer School of Engineering at Dartmouth College.  He also serves on the boards of MIT’s David H. Koch Institute for Integrative Cancer Research, The Arthur Rock Center for Entrepreneurship, and the Healthcare Initiative Advisory Board.

McGuire also represents Polaris on the boards of directors of a number of the firm's portfolio companies including Acceleron Pharma, AdiMAB, Arsenal Medical, Ironwood Pharmaceuticals, Iora Health, Life Line Screening, MicroCHIPS, Pulmatrix, SustainX and Trevena.

In 2005, McGuire received the Albert Einstein Award for Outstanding Achievement in the Life Sciences.  In 2009, he was the recipient of the Massachusetts Society for Medical Research Award.  He was listed in Forbes - The Midas 100 of Top Tech Investors for 2011, the 2013 Top 10 Life Sciences Investors, and again to the Midas 100 list in 2014.  TheFunded ranked McGuire its most loved VC.

Education

McGuire received an MBA from Harvard Business School in 1985.  Prior to that, he earned his MS in engineering from the Thayer School of Engineering at Dartmouth College.  He became a Thomas J. Watson fellow in 1979.  McGuire earned his BS in physics and economics from Hobart College.

In 2012 Terry was awarded an honorary Doctorate of Laws degree from Ohio Wesleyan University for his work in translational science.  In 2016, McGuire received an honorary Doctorate of Humane Letters from Canisius College, serving as the commencement speaker the same year.

References

External links 
Forbes Midas List Profile 2014 - Terry McGuire
Forbes Midas List Top Healthcare Investors 2013
Forbes Midas List Profile 2011 - Terry McGuire
Polaris Venture Partners - Terry McGuire
Done Deals:  Venture Capitalists Tell Their Stories - Harvard Business School Press 2000 
MITs Langer-Polaris McGuire have startup formula for success

Living people
American venture capitalists
Harvard Business School alumni
Thayer School of Engineering alumni
Hobart and William Smith Colleges alumni
Year of birth missing (living people)